Marcin Stefanik (born 25 June 1987 in Dębica) is a Polish professional footballer who plays as a midfielder for Siarka Tarnobrzeg.

Career
In the summer 2010, he joined Kolejarz Stróże.

References

External links
 
 Marcin Stefanik at Soccerway

1987 births
Living people
Polish footballers
Widzew Łódź players
Concordia Piotrków Trybunalski players
Siarka Tarnobrzeg players
Sandecja Nowy Sącz players
Kolejarz Stróże players
Puszcza Niepołomice players
I liga players
II liga players
III liga players
People from Dębica
Sportspeople from Podkarpackie Voivodeship
Association football midfielders